James Tennant Baldwin (May 6, 1933 – March 2, 2018), often known as Jay Baldwin or J. Baldwin, was an American industrial designer and writer. Baldwin was a student of Buckminster Fuller; Baldwin's work was inspired by Fuller's principles and, in the case of some of Baldwin's published writings, he popularized and interpreted Fuller's ideas and achievements. In his own right, Baldwin was a figure in American designers' efforts to incorporate solar, wind, and other renewable energy sources. In his career, being a fabricator was as important as being a designer. Baldwin was noted as the inventor of the "Pillow Dome", a design that combines Buckminster Fuller's geodesic dome with panels of inflated ETFE plastic panels.

Life and work 
J. Baldwin. born the son of an engineer, once said that, at 18, he heard Buckminster Fuller speak for 14 hours non-stop. This was in 1951 at the University of Michigan, where Baldwin had enrolled to learn automobile design because a friend of his had been killed in a car accident that Baldwin attributed to bad design. He worked with Fuller prior to graduation from U. of M. in 1955. During his student years, Baldwin worked (in a unique job sharing role) in an auto factory assembly line. He went on to do graduate work at the University of California, Berkeley.

Baldwin remained a friend of Buckminster Fuller, and reflected that "By example, he encouraged me to think for myself comprehensively, to be disciplined, to work for the good of everyone, and to have a good time doing it."

As a young designer in the late 1950s and early 1960s, Baldwin designed advanced camping equipment with Bill Moss Associates. Thereafter, he taught simultaneously at San Francisco State College (now called San Francisco State University), San Francisco Art Institute, and the Oakland campus of California College of Arts & Crafts for about six years.

The period 1968-69 found him both a visiting lecturer at Southern Illinois University and the design editor of the innovative Whole Earth Catalog. The Catalog came out in many editions between 1968 and 1998, and Baldwin continued to edit and write for both the Catalog and an offshoot publication, CoEvolution Quarterly, later renamed Whole Earth Review. In the early 1970s, Baldwin taught at Pacific High School.

Baldwin was at the center of experimentation with geodesic domes, an unconventional building-design approach – explored by Fuller – that maximizes strength and covered area in relation to materials used. He also dove enthusiastically into the application of renewable energy sources in homes and in food-production facilities, working with Integrated Life Support Systems Laboratories (ILS, in New Mexico) and with Dr. John Todd and the other New Alchemists involved with "The Ark" project. Baldwin's initial involvement with solar energy was during that very experimental, ad-lib phase when much was moving from principles or theory into actual development. In the 1970s, at ILS, he was the co-developer of what was touted as the world's first building to be heated and otherwise powered by solar and wind power exclusively.

At Prince Edward Island, Baldwin perfected his greenhouse design: successfully maintaining Banana trees. He used several water tanks filled with tilapia, as a source of natural fertilizer for his hydroponics system. His greenhouse included a volume of compost for the production of heat, which was recirculated by ceiling fans. All of these are now the staples for the components of modern greenhouse construction design.

Baldwin referred to his own rural home as "a three-dimensional sketchpad".

During the first Jerry Brown administration, Baldwin worked in the California Office of Appropriate Technology. After the 1970s, Baldwin continued to work as a designer in association with numerous organizations and projects. He organized for himself a mobile design studio and machine workshop (in a van pulling an Airstream trailer), to drive to various projects across America.

With the ears of a wider audience in the 1980s, Baldwin developed an incisive critique of the American automobile industry, which he viewed as over-focused on superficial marketing concerns and farcically under-concerned with real innovation and improvement. He was also a constructive critic of the emerging industries manufacturing "soft technology" equipment, like wind turbines. In the late 1990s, he worked with the Rocky Mountain Institute of Snowmass, Colorado, in the research, design, and development of the ultralight, ultra-efficient "Hypercar" — a prototype by way of which independent designers hoped to show the way for the world's auto manufacturers. With conceptual development having begun in 1991, one version of the Hypercar used a small generator to power an electric motor in each wheel.

Given his long-term role as a "technology" editor, it is worth mentioning the scope of Baldwin's focus on technology. His interests remained broader than that represented in the shifting media and popular focus of the mid 1980s and later, which inclined to highlight the micro chip and electronic devices based on it. Baldwin continued to point out the value of (and need for evaluation of) technologies within a larger perimeter. Certainly shelter and transportation technologies always interested him. So did tools – and whether a device or tool or process was freshly innovative or age-old in concept, if it enabled a person to "do the job" with wood, metal, fiberglass panels, soil, trees, or whatever, it remained worthy of Baldwin's attention. And while he never ceased to be interested in the products of the factory, Baldwin always wanted to empower individuals and small teams of people to accomplish something worthwhile.

 Baldwin, as one of the notable designer-technologists whose cross-disciplinary approaches have opened new territory, was featured in the 1994 documentary film Ecological Design: Inventing the Future. The film viewed these designers as "outlaws" whose careers had necessarily developed "outside the box" of their time, largely unsupported by mainstream industry and often beyond the pale of mainstream academia, as well.

Baldwin invented a permanent, transparent, insulated geodesic dome — using a framework of aluminum tubing, covered with argon-filled laminated vinyl sheet "pillows" — which he dubbed the "Pillow Dome", said to have withstood 135-mph winds and thirty inches of snow. The structure weighed just one-half pound per square foot of floor space. For a variety of reasons including durability and toxicity concerns from vinyl chloride vapor emitted by vinyl sheeting, Baldwin later recommended the use of ETFE film; ETFE had further advantages including transparency and ease of keeping the surface clean, but its ultraviolet transparency reduces its suitability for occupied structures. Baldwin intentionally did not patent his invention. The basic approach has since been applied in large-scale applications such as the Eden Project in Cornwall, England.

Baldwin continued to practice design (as exemplified in the unique and aerodynamic 'mobile-room' Quick-Up camper he put on the market) and to teach design at the college level up until 2016. Between the early 1990s and 2016 he taught at Sonoma State University, San Francisco Institute of Architecture, and at California College of Arts & Crafts.

Baldwin died on March 2, 2018, at the age of 84.

Books 
 Author: Why You Can't Fly, 2015, .
 Author: BuckyWorks: Buckminster Fuller's Ideas for Today, 1997, .
 Co-editor (with Stewart Brand and others): Whole Earth Catalogs, 1968–1998.
 Co-editor (with Stewart Brand): Soft-Tech, 1978, .
 Editor Whole Earth Ecolog: The Best of Environmental Tools & Ideas, 1990, .

References

External links 
 J. Baldwin - Solutioneering
 Hypercar Concept
 Pillow Dome Description
 About 450 on-line book reviews and articles by J. Baldwin
 Solar Energy and Solar-integrated Architecture

1933 births
2018 deaths
American industrial designers
California College of the Arts faculty
Solar building designers
University of Michigan alumni